Kim Anderson may refer to:
Kim Anderson (American football) (born 1957), American football player
Kim Anderson (basketball) (born 1955), American basketball coach
Kim Anderson (cyclist) (born 1968), American female cyclist
Kim Anderson (singer) (born 1981), bassist for the band Flee the Seen
Kim Anderson, the former husband of Stevie Nicks (born 1948)
Kim Anderzon (1943–2014), Swedish actress
Kim Anderson (professor), Canadian professor

See also
Kim Andersson (born 1982), Swedish handball player
Kim W. Andersson (born 1979), Swedish illustrator
Kim Andersen (disambiguation)